Vishwash Chauhan (born 13 January 1995) is a stage artist who displays theater, acting and stand up comedy skills. He belongs to Charkhi Dadri, Haryana. Vishwash Chauhan is the finalist for The Great Indian Laughter Challenge, 2017. Born in Haryana, he brings all his memories from Haryana on the stage. He is also known as Kalu. His tagline is Maa ka Lal, Haryana ka Kalu!. He is a rising star and working in many upcoming web series including live performances.

Early and personal life
Vishwash was born  to Mr Ranjit Singh in Charkhi Dadri, Haryana, India, on 13 January 1995. He completed his 10th in 2009 and 12th in 2011 from Vaish Sr Sec School Charkhi Dadri. Later he took admission in Kurukshetra University for his graduation. Since school days, he was keen participant in different acting and dancing competitions that bring him into limelight.

Career
Vishwash took part in various College Youth Festivals and National Level festivals during his college. But he rose to fame after his video in the comedy reality television show The Great Indian Laughter Challenge in 2017, got viral on the internet. Vishwash Chauhan, has also been honored at the National Youth Festival. Vishwash has left his mark on the national level where he has got a national award five time. He has been performing his art in the acting world for seven years. After achieving one success, Vishwash has illuminated the name of the area.

References

Indian male comedians
Living people
Indian stand-up comedians
1995 births